The chicken (Gallus gallus domesticus) is a domesticated junglefowl species, with attributes of wild species such as the grey and the Ceylon junglefowl that are originally from Southeast Asia. Rooster and cock are terms for adult male birds, and a younger male may be called a cockerel. A male that has been castrated is a capon. An adult female bird is called a hen, and a sexually immature female is called a pullet. Humans keep chickens primarily as a source of food (consuming both their meat and eggs) or as pets. Traditionally they were also bred for cockfighting, which is still practiced in some places. Chickens domesticated for meat are broilers and for eggs are layers.

Chickens are one of the most common and widespread domestic animals, with a total population of 23.7 billion , up from more than 19 billion in 2011. There are more chickens in the world than any other bird. There are numerous cultural references to chickens—in myth, folklore and religion, and in language and literature.

Genetic studies have pointed to multiple maternal origin theories of within South Asia, Southeast Asia, and East Asia, but the clade found in the Americas, Europe, the Middle East and Africa originated from the Indian subcontinent. From ancient India, the chicken spread to the Eastern Mediterranean. They appear in ancient Egypt in the mid-15th century BC, with the "bird that gives birth every day" having come from the land between Syria and Shinar, Babylonia, according to the annals of Thutmose III. They are known in ancient Greece from the 5th century BC.

Terminology 
An adult male is a called a cock or (in the United States) a rooster and an adult female is called a hen.

Other terms are:
 Biddy: a newly hatched chicken
 Capon: a castrated or neutered male chicken
 Chick: a young chicken
 Chook : a chicken (Australia/New Zealand, informal)
 Cockerel: a young male chicken less than a year old
 Dunghill fowl: a chicken with mixed parentage from different domestic varieties.
 Pullet: a young female chicken less than a year old. In the poultry industry, a pullet is a sexually immature chicken less than 22 weeks of age.
 Yardbird: a chicken (southern United States, dialectal)

Chicken may also mean a chick .  In fact, chicken was originally a term only for an immature, or at least young, bird. In older sources, chicken as a species were typically referred to as common fowl or domestic fowl.  

In Australian vernacular English the word chook provides the generic term for the species (e.g. "a cooked chook" or "she keeps chooks"); which enables chicken to commonly retain its original sense of a young or recently hatched bird. Chick is then rarely used to mean chicken, but is mainly used in Merriam-Webster's "Sense 1b" viz. the young of any bird.

Etymology 
According to Merriam-Webster, the term rooster (i.e. a roosting bird) originated in the mid- or late 18th century as a euphemism to avoid the sexual connotation of the original English cock, and is widely used throughout North America. Roosting is the action of perching aloft to sleep at night.

History 

An early domestication of chickens in Southeast Asia is probable, since the word for domestic chicken (*manuk) is part of the reconstructed Proto-Austronesian language . Chickens, together with dogs and pigs, were the domestic animals of the Lapita culture, the first Neolithic culture of Oceania.

The first pictures of chickens in Europe are found on Corinthian pottery of the 7th century BC.

Chickens were spread by Polynesian seafarers and reached Easter Island in the 12th century AD, where they were the only domestic animal, with the possible exception of the Polynesian rat (Rattus exulans). They were housed in chicken coops built from stone, which was first reported as such to Linton Palmer in 1868, who also "expressed his doubts about this".

Biology and habitat 

Chickens are omnivores. In the wild, they often scratch at the soil to search for seeds, insects, and even animals as large as lizards, small snakes, or sometimes young mice.

The average chicken may live for 5–10 years, depending on the breed. The world's oldest known chicken lived 16 years according to Guinness World Records.

Roosters can usually be differentiated from hens by their striking plumage of long flowing tails and shiny, pointed feathers on their necks (hackles) and backs (saddle), which are typically of brighter, bolder colours than those of females of the same breed. However, in some breeds, such as the Sebright chicken, the rooster has only slightly pointed neck feathers, the same colour as the hen's. The identification can be made by looking at the comb, or eventually from the development of spurs on the male's legs (in a few breeds and in certain hybrids, the male and female chicks may be differentiated by colour). 

Adult chickens have a fleshy crest on their heads called a comb, or cockscomb, and hanging flaps of skin either side under their beaks called wattles. Collectively, these and other fleshy protuberances on the head and throat are called caruncles. Both the adult male and female have wattles and combs, but in most breeds these are more prominent in males. A 'muff' or 'beard' is a mutation found in several chicken breeds which causes extra feathering under the chicken's face, giving the appearance of a beard.

Domestic chickens are not capable of long-distance flight, although lighter chickens are generally capable of flying for short distances, such as over fences or into trees (where they would naturally roost). Chickens may occasionally fly briefly to explore their surroundings but generally do so only to flee perceived danger.

Behavior

Social behaviour 

Chickens are gregarious birds and live together in flocks. They have a communal approach to the incubation of eggs and raising of young. Individual chickens in a flock will dominate others, establishing a pecking order, with dominant individuals having priority for food access and nesting locations. Removing hens or roosters from a flock causes a temporary disruption to this social order until a new pecking order is established. Adding hens, especially younger birds, to an existing flock can lead to fighting and injury.

Chickens may occasionally gang up on a weak or inexperienced predator. At least one credible report exists of a young fox killed by hens. A group of hens have been recorded in attacking a hawk that had entered their coop. If a chicken is threatened by predators, stress, or is sick, it may puff up its feathers.

Vocalizations 
When a rooster finds food, he may call other chickens to eat first. He does this by clucking in a high pitch as well as picking up and dropping the food. This behaviour may also be observed in mother hens to call their chicks and encourage them to eat.

A rooster's crowing is a loud and sometimes shrill call and sends a territorial signal to other roosters. However, roosters may also crow in response to sudden disturbances within their surroundings.

Hens cluck loudly after laying an egg and also to call their chicks. Chickens also give different warning calls when they sense a predator approaching from the air or on the ground.

Crowing 

Roosters almost always start crowing before four months of age. Although it is possible for a hen to crow as well, crowing (together with hackles development) is one of the clearest signs of being a rooster.

Rooster crowing contests are a traditional sport in several countries, such as Germany, the Netherlands, Belgium, the United States, Indonesia and Japan. The oldest contests are held with longcrowers. Depending on the breed, either the duration of the crowing or the times the rooster crows within a certain time is measured.

Courtship 
To initiate courting, some roosters may dance in a circle around or near a hen (a circle dance), often lowering the wing which is closest to the hen. The dance triggers a response in the hen and when she responds to his call, the rooster may mount the hen and proceed with the mating.

More specifically, mating typically involves the following sequence:

 Male approaching the hen
 Male pre-copulatory waltzing
 Male waltzing
 Female crouching (receptive posture) or stepping aside or running away (if unwilling to copulate)
 Male mounting
 Male treading with both feet on hen's back
 Male tail bending (following successful copulation)

Nesting and laying behaviour 

Hens will often try to lay in nests that already contain eggs and have been known to move eggs from neighbouring nests into their own. The result of this behaviour is that a flock will use only a few preferred locations, rather than having a different nest for every bird. Hens will often express a preference to lay in the same location. Two or more hens may try to share the same nest at the same time. If the nest is small or one of the hens is particularly determined, this may result in chickens trying to lay on top of each other. There is evidence that individual hens prefer to be either solitary or gregarious nesters.

Broodiness 

Under natural conditions, most birds lay only until a clutch is complete and they will then incubate all the eggs. Hens are then said to "go broody". The broody hen will stop laying and instead will focus on the incubation of the eggs (a full clutch is usually about 12 eggs). She will sit or 'set' on the nest, fluffing up or pecking in defense if disturbed or removed. The hen will rarely leave the nest to eat, drink, or dust-bathe. While brooding, the hen maintains the nest at a constant temperature and humidity, as well as turning the eggs regularly during the first part of the incubation. To stimulate broodiness, owners may place several artificial eggs in the nest. To discourage it, they may place the hen in an elevated cage with an open wire floor.

Breeds artificially developed for egg production rarely go broody, and those that do often stop part-way through the incubation. However, other breeds, such as the Cochin, Cornish and Silkie, do regularly go broody, and make excellent mothers, not only for chicken eggs but also for those of other species — even those with much smaller or larger eggs and different incubation periods, such as quail, pheasants, ducks, turkeys, or geese.

Hatching and early life 
Fertile chicken eggs hatch at the end of the incubation period, about 21 days. Development of the chick starts only when incubation begins, so all chicks hatch within a day or two of each other, despite perhaps being laid over a period of two weeks or so. Before hatching, the hen can hear the chicks peeping inside the eggs and will gently cluck to stimulate them to break out of their shells. The chick begins by pipping: pecking a breathing hole with its egg tooth towards the blunt end of the egg, usually on the upper side. The chick then rests for some hours, absorbing the remaining egg yolk and withdrawing the blood supply from the membrane beneath the shell (used earlier for breathing through the shell). The chick then enlarges the hole, gradually turning round as it goes, and eventually severing the blunt end of the shell completely to make a lid. The chick crawls out of the remaining shell, and the wet down dries out in the warmth of the nest.

Hens usually remain on the nest for about two days after the first chick hatches, and during this time the newly hatched chicks feed by absorbing the internal yolk sac. Some breeds sometimes start eating cracked eggs, which can become habitual. Hens fiercely guard their chicks and brood them when necessary to keep them warm, at first often returning to the nest at night. She leads them to food and water and will call them toward edible items but seldom feeds them directly. She continues to care for them until they are several weeks old.

Reproduction 
Sperm transfer occurs by cloacal contact between the male and female, in a maneuver known as the 'cloacal kiss'. As with birds in general, reproduction is controlled by a neuroendocrine system, the Gonadotropin-Releasing Hormone-I neurons in the hypothalamus. Locally to the reproductive system, reproductive hormones such as estrogen, progesterone, gonadotropins (luteinizing hormone and follicle-stimulating hormone) initiate and maintain sexual maturation changes. Over time there is reproductive decline, thought to be due to GnRH-I-N decline. Because there is significant inter-individual variability in egg-producing duration, it is believed to be possible to breed for further extended useful lifetime in egg-layers.

Embryology 

Chicken embryos have long been used as model organisms to study developing embryos. Large numbers of embryos can be provided by commercial chicken farmers who sell fertilized eggs which can be easily opened and used to observe the developing embryo. Equally important, embryologists can carry out experiments on such embryos, close the egg again and study the effect later on. For instance, many important discoveries in the area of limb development have been made using chicken embryos, such as the discovery of the apical ectodermal ridge and the zone of polarizing activity by John W. Saunders.

In 2006, scientists researching the ancestry of birds "turned on" a chicken recessive gene, talpid2, and found that the embryo jaws initiated formation of teeth, like those found in ancient bird fossils. John Fallon, the overseer of the project, stated that chickens have "...retained the ability to make teeth, under certain conditions... ."

Genetics and genomics 

Given its eminent role in farming, meat production, but also research, the house chicken was the first bird genome to be sequenced. At 1.21 Gb, the chicken genome is considerably smaller than other vertebrate genomes, such as the human genome (3 Gb). The final gene set contained 26,640 genes (including noncoding genes and pseudogenes), with a total of 19,119 protein-coding genes in annotation release 103 (2017), a similar number of protein-coding genes as in the human genome.

Physiology 
Populations of chickens from high-altitude regions like Tibet have special physiological adaptations that result in a higher hatching rate in low oxygen environments. When eggs are placed in a hypoxic environment, chicken embryos from these populations express much more hemoglobin than embryos from other chicken populations. This hemoglobin also has a greater affinity for oxygen, allowing hemoglobin to bind to oxygen more readily.

Pinopsins were originally discovered in the chicken pineal gland.

Although all avians appear to have lost TLR9, artificial immunity against bacterial pathogens has been induced in neonatal chicks by Taghavi et al. 2008 using tailored oligodeoxynucleotides.

Origin and dispersal

Origin 

Galliformes, the order of bird that chickens belong to, is directly linked to the survival of birds when all other dinosaurs went extinct. Water or ground-dwelling fowl, similar to modern partridges, survived the Cretaceous–Paleogene extinction event that killed all tree-dwelling birds and dinosaurs. Some of these evolved into the modern galliformes, of which domesticated chickens are a main model. They are descended primarily from the red junglefowl (Gallus gallus) and are scientifically classified as the same species. As such, domesticated chickens can and do freely interbreed with populations of red junglefowl. Subsequent hybridization of the domestic chicken with grey junglefowl, Sri Lankan junglefowl and green junglefowl occurred; a gene for yellow skin, for instance, was incorporated into domestic birds through hybridization with the grey junglefowl (G. sonneratii). In a study published in 2020, it was found that chickens shared between 71% - 79% of their genome with red junglefowl, with the period of domestication dated to 8,000 years ago.

Domestication 
According to one early study, a single domestication event of the red junglefowl in present-day Thailand gave rise to the modern chicken with minor transitions separating the modern breeds. The red junglefowl is well adapted to take advantage of the vast quantities of seed produced during the end of the multi-decade bamboo seeding cycle, to boost its own reproduction. In domesticating the chicken, humans took advantage of this predisposition for prolific reproduction of the red junglefowl when exposed to large amounts of food.

Exactly when and where the chicken was domesticated remains a controversial issue. Genomic studies estimate that the chicken was domesticated 8,000 years ago in Southeast Asia and spread to China and India 2,000 to 3,000 years later. Archaeological evidence supports domestic chickens in Southeast Asia well before 6000 BC, China by 6000 BC and India by 2000 BC. A landmark 2020 Nature study that fully sequenced 863 chickens across the world suggests that all domestic chickens originate from a single domestication event of red junglefowl whose present-day distribution is predominantly in southwestern China, northern Thailand and Myanmar. These domesticated chickens spread across Southeast and South Asia where they interbred with local wild species of junglefowl, forming genetically and geographically distinct groups. Analysis of the most popular commercial breed shows that the White Leghorn breed possesses a mosaic of divergent ancestries inherited from subspecies of red junglefowl.

Dispersal 
Middle Eastern chicken remains go back to a little earlier than 2000 BC in Syria. They reached Egypt for purposes of cockfighting about 1400 BC and became widely bred in Egypt around 300 BC. Phoenicians spread chickens along the Mediterranean coasts as far as Iberia. During the Hellenistic period (4th–2nd centuries BC), in the southern Levant, chickens began to be widely domesticated for food. This change occurred at least 100 years before domestication of chickens spread to Europe. 

Chickens reached Europe circa 100 BC. Breeding increased under the Roman Empire and reduced by the Middle Ages. Genetic sequencing of chicken bones from archaeological sites in Europe revealed that in the High Middle Ages chickens became less aggressive and began to lay eggs earlier in the breeding season.

Three possible routes of introduction into Africa around the early first millennium AD could have been through the Egyptian Nile Valley, the East Africa Roman-Greek or Indian trade, or from Carthage and the Berbers, across the Sahara. The earliest known remains are from Mali, Nubia, East Coast, and South Africa and date back to the middle of the first millennium AD.

Domestic chicken in the Americas before Western contact is still an ongoing discussion, but blue-egged chickens, found only in the Americas and Asia, suggest an Asian origin for early American chickens. A lack of data from Thailand, Russia, the Indian subcontinent, Southeast Asia and Sub-Saharan Africa makes it difficult to lay out a clear map of the spread of chickens in these areas; better description and genetic analysis of local breeds threatened by extinction may also help with research into this area.

South America 
An unusual variety of chicken that has its origins in South America is the Araucana, bred in southern Chile by the Mapuche people. Araucanas lay blue-green eggs. Additionally, some Araucanas are tailless, and some have tufts of feathers around their ears. It has long been suggested that they pre-date the arrival of European chickens brought by the Spanish and are evidence of pre-Columbian trans-Pacific contacts between Asian or Pacific Oceanic peoples, particularly the Polynesians, and South America. In 2007, an international team of researchers reported the results of their analysis of chicken bones found on the Arauco Peninsula in south-central Chile. Radiocarbon dating suggested that the chickens were pre-Columbian, and DNA analysis showed that they were related to prehistoric populations of chickens in Polynesia. These results appeared to confirm that the chickens came from Polynesia and that there were transpacific contacts between Polynesia and South America before Columbus' arrival in the Americas.

However, a later report looking at the same specimens concluded:
A published, apparently pre-Columbian, Chilean specimen and six pre-European Polynesian specimens also cluster with the same European/Indian subcontinental/Southeast Asian sequences, providing no support for a Polynesian introduction of chickens to South America. In contrast, sequences from two archaeological sites on Easter Island group with an uncommon haplogroup from Indonesia, Japan, and China and may represent a genetic signature of an early Polynesian dispersal. Modeling of the potential marine carbon contribution to the Chilean archaeological specimen casts further doubt on claims for pre-Columbian chickens, and definitive proof will require further analyses of ancient DNA sequences and radiocarbon and stable isotope data from archaeological excavations within both Chile and Polynesia.
The debate for and against a Polynesian origin for South American chickens continued with this 2014 paper and subsequent responses in PNAS.

Use by humans

Farming 

More than 50 billion chickens are reared annually as a source of meat and eggs. In the United States alone, more than 8 billion chickens are slaughtered each year for meat, and more than 300 million chickens are reared for egg production. The vast majority of poultry is raised in factory farms. According to the Worldwatch Institute, 74% of the world's poultry meat and 68% of eggs are produced this way. An alternative to intensive poultry farming is free-range farming.

Friction between these two main methods has led to long-term issues of ethical consumerism. Opponents of intensive farming argue that it harms the environment, creates human health risks and is inhumane. Advocates of intensive farming say that their highly efficient systems save land and food resources owing to increased productivity, and that the animals are looked after in state-of-the-art environmentally controlled facilities.

Reared for meat 

Chickens farmed for meat are called broilers. Chickens will naturally live for six or more years, but broiler breeds typically take less than six weeks to reach slaughter size. A free range or organic broiler will usually be slaughtered at about 14 weeks of age.

Reared for eggs 

Chickens farmed primarily for eggs are called layer hens. In total, the UK alone consumes more than 34 million eggs per day. Some hen breeds can produce over 300 eggs per year, with the highest authenticated rate of egg laying being 371 eggs in 364 days. After 12 months of laying, the commercial hen's egg-laying ability starts to decline to the point where the flock is commercially unviable. Hens, particularly from battery cage systems, are sometimes infirm or have lost a significant amount of their feathers, and their life expectancy has been reduced from around seven years to less than two years. 

In the UK and Europe, laying hens are then slaughtered and used in processed foods or sold as 'soup hens'. In some other countries, flocks are sometimes force moulted rather than being slaughtered to re-invigorate egg-laying. This involves complete withdrawal of food (and sometimes water) for 7–14 days or sufficiently long to cause a body weight loss of 25 to 35%, or up to 28 days under experimental conditions. This stimulates the hen to lose her feathers but also re-invigorates egg-production. Some flocks may be force-moulted several times. In 2003, more than 75% of all flocks were moulted in the US.

As pets 

Keeping chickens as pets became increasingly popular in the 2000s among urban and suburban residents. Many people obtain chickens for their egg production but often name them and treat them as any other pet like cats or dogs. Chickens provide companionship and have individual personalities. While many do not cuddle much, they will eat from one's hand, jump onto one's lap, respond to and follow their handlers, as well as show affection.

Chickens are social, inquisitive, intelligent birds, and many find their behaviour entertaining. Certain breeds, such as silkies and many bantam varieties, are generally docile and are often recommended as good pets around children with disabilities. Many people feed chickens in part with kitchen food scraps.

Cockfighting 

A cockfight is a contest held in a ring called a cockpit between two cocks known as gamecocks. This term, denoting a cock kept for game, sport, pastime or entertainment, appears in 1646, after "cock of the game" used by George Wilson in the earliest known book on the secular sport, The Commendation of Cocks and Cock Fighting of 1607. Gamecocks are not typical farm chickens. The cocks are specially bred and trained for increased stamina and strength. The comb and wattle are removed from a young gamecock because if left intact, they would be a disadvantage during a match. This process is called dubbing. Sometimes the cocks are given drugs to increase their stamina or thicken their blood, which increases their chances of winning. Cockfighting is considered a traditional sporting event by some but an example of animal cruelty by others and is therefore outlawed in most countries. Usually wagers are made on the outcome of the match, with the survivor or last bird standing declared winner.

Cocks possess congenital aggression toward other cocks to contest for females. Studies suggest that cockfights have existed even up to the Indus Valley civilisation as a pastime. Today it is commonly associated with religious worship, pastime, and gambling in Asian and some South American countries. While not all fights are to the death, most use metal spurs as a weapon attached above or below the chicken's own spur, which typically results in death in one or both cocks. If chickens are in practice, owners place gloves on the spurs to prevent injuries.

Artificial incubation 
Incubation can occur artificially in machines that provide the correct, controlled environment for the developing chick. The average incubation period for chickens is 21 days, but the duration depends on the temperature and humidity in the incubator. Temperature regulation is the most critical factor for a successful hatch. Humidity is also important because the rate at which eggs lose water by evaporation depends on the ambient relative humidity. Evaporation can be assessed by candling, to view the size of the air sac, or by measuring weight loss. Relative humidity should be increased to around 70% in the last three days of incubation to keep the membrane around the hatching chick from drying out after the chick cracks the shell. Lower humidity is usual in the first 18 days to ensure adequate evaporation. 

The position of the eggs in the incubator can also influence hatch rates. For best results, eggs should be placed with the pointed ends down and turned regularly (at least three times per day) until one to three days before hatching. If the eggs are not turned, the embryo inside may stick to the shell and may hatch with physical defects. Adequate ventilation is necessary to provide the embryo with oxygen. Older eggs require increased ventilation.

Many commercial incubators are industrial-sized with shelves holding tens of thousands of eggs at a time, with rotation of the eggs a fully automated process. Home incubators are boxes holding from 6 to 75 eggs.

Diseases and ailments 

Chickens are susceptible to several parasites, including lice, mites, ticks, fleas, and intestinal worms, as well as other diseases. Despite the name, they are not affected by chickenpox, which is generally restricted to humans. Chickens can carry and transmit salmonella in their dander and feces. In the United States, the Centers for Disease Control and Prevention advise against bringing them indoors or letting small children handle them.

Some of the diseases that can affect chickens are shown below:

Gallery

Notes

References

External links 

 
Birds described in 1758
Bird common names
Taxa named by Carl Linnaeus
Articles containing video clips
Junglefowls
Poultry
Subspecies
Cosmopolitan birds
National symbols of Kenya
Heraldic beasts